The Bratcu is a right tributary of the river Jiu in Romania. It flows into the Jiu north of Bumbești-Jiu.

References

Rivers of Romania
Rivers of Gorj County